Mackenzie Caquatto Jaworksi (born March 26, 1992) is a former artistic gymnast who represented the United States at the 2010 World Championships and competed for the University of Florida. Her younger sister, Bridgette Caquatto, is also a former elite gymnast. She married former elite runner Griffin Jaworski on September 4, 2020.

Gymnastics career

2007–9 
Caquatto first qualified as an elite gymnast in 2007 and competed at the National Championships that year, finishing 17th.  

Her first senior competition was the 2008 National Championships, where she placed 10th in the all-around. She was named to the national team and qualified to the Olympic Trials, but competed only on the first day, finishing 12th.  

In 2009, she competed at her first international meets as a member of the national team and placed 5th at the National Championships, despite a knee injury. At the Toyota International in Japan, she competed on the uneven bars, balance beam, and floor exercise and won the silver medal on bars with a score of 14.675, behind world silver medalist Koko Tsurumi of Japan. She was also the first alternate to the U.S. team for the 2009 World Artistic Gymnastics Championships.

2010 
Caquatto started her 2010 season at the City of Jesolo Trophy in Italy, where she had the highest beam score but missed a medal in the all-around because of mistakes on floor exercise. At the 2010 U.S. Classic, she placed 3rd in the all-around, with the second-highest scores on vault and uneven bars but a fall on balance beam. She qualified to the National Championships, where she placed 5th in the all-around after falling on a simple grip change on the uneven bars, her best event.

Based on her performance at Nationals, Caquatto advanced to the team selection camp for the 2010 World Championships. She went on to win the all-around at a second selection camp and was named to the team.

At the World Championships, she placed 9th in the all-around in qualifications but did not advance to the individual all-around final because only two athletes per country can qualify, and her teammates Aly Raisman and Rebecca Bross scored higher. In the team final, she scored 14.666 on bars and 15.000 on vault to help the U.S. win the silver medal, behind Russia but ahead of China.

2011 
After competing for the University of Florida for the 2010–11 season, Caquatto decided to train for a comeback to elite gymnastics. At the 2011 U.S. Classic, she competed on bars, scoring 14.750, and performed a somewhat watered-down routine on balance beam, scoring 14.100.

At the National Championships, she competed in the all-around and finished the first day of competition in sixth place with a score of 56.000, counting a fall on beam. However, with solid performances on the second day of competition and injuries to Chellsie Memmel and defending national champion Bross, she placed fourth behind Jordyn Wieber, Raisman, and McKayla Maroney. She also took second place on the uneven bars, just 0.050 behind Wieber.

Caquatto earned a spot on her fourth national team and was invited to the first world team selection camp, but she injured her ankles on a beam dismount at the camp. After sitting out the beginning of the NCAA season, she began competing on the uneven bars again in early 2012.

Skills

Caquatto performed the following skills in 2010:

 *Variation competed for 2011.

Competitive history

Senior career history

References

 

1992 births
Living people
American female artistic gymnasts
Medalists at the World Artistic Gymnastics Championships
Florida Gators women's gymnasts
U.S. women's national team gymnasts
NCAA gymnasts who have scored a perfect 10
21st-century American women